is a dormant stratovolcano in Gunma, eastern Honshū, Japan.

Outline 
Mount Haruna started to form more than 300,000 years ago and the last known eruption was 550 AD. The volcano has a summit caldera containing the symmetrical cinder cone of Mount Haruna-Fuji, along with a crater lake, Lake Haruna, along the western side.

The lake and the area to its east, as well as the southern and southwestern slopes, lie within the borders of Takasaki city. The border of Shibukawa city (to the east) nearly approaches Lake Haruna. Both Shinto village and Yoshioka town are on the southeast slopes of the mountain. The northern and northwestern slopes lie within Higashi Agatsuma town, which also bounds Lake Haruna. The summit lies on the border of Takasaki and Higashi Agatsuma.

Mount Haruna, along with Mount Akagi and Mount Myōgi, is one of the "Three Mountains of Jōmō." (Jōmō is an old name for Gunma.)

In popular culture
The mountain was made famous in the manga series Initial D under the fictional name Akina (秋名), where the main character, Takumi Fujiwara, delivers tofu every day to a hotel uphill, and back down using his father's highly modified Toyota Sprinter Trueno (AE86). It is also where Takumi won his first few races. It is the home course for the racing team called the Akina Speed Stars with which Takumi becomes closely associated. Later in the anime Takumi due to his unbeatable track records and for his downhill driving technique, is popularly referred to as 'Akina's 86'.

The mountain is featured in the PlayStation 2 games Kaido Battle, Kaido Battle 2: Chain Reaction and Kaido: Touge no Densetsu. It is also featured in the PC games Race Driver: GRID and Blur, although not realistically.

Gallery

Climate

See also
List of volcanoes in Japan
The World War II-era battleship Haruna and the recently decommissioned JMSDF destroyer Haruna were named after the mountain.
Haruna, Gunma
Haruna Shrine
Harunasan Ropeway
Initial D

References

External links 

 Harunasan - Japan Meteorological Agency 
  - Japan Meteorological Agency
 Haruna San - Geological Survey of Japan

Stratovolcanoes of Japan
Volcanoes of Honshū
Mountains of Gunma Prefecture
VEI-5 volcanoes
Volcanic crater lakes
Volcanoes of Gunma Prefecture
Pleistocene stratovolcanoes
Holocene stratovolcanoes